Gorova River may refer to the following rivers in Romania:

 Gorova, a tributary of the Bârzava in Caraș-Severin County
 Gorova, a tributary of the Râul Alb in Hunedoara County
 Gorova, a tributary of the Tur in Satu Mare County